Bin Kashiwa (ビンカシワ) is a Japanese illustrator who was born in Hokkaido, in 1944. He spent most of his time in Europe, spending 15 years in Paris, France. His prints are done in a clean, decorative, detailed, innocent and naive style. His illustrations portray a world of fantasies.

References

1944 births
Japanese illustrators
Living people